Alexander "Alex" Omar Hinshaw (born October 31, 1982) is an American 
former professional baseball pitcher. He graduated from Claremont High School and attended Chaffey College and San Diego State University. He played in Major League Baseball for the San Francisco Giants, San Diego Padres and Chicago Cubs from 2008-2012.

Background
Hinshaw was born in California to an American father and Afghan mother.

San Francisco Giants

Hinshaw was drafted by the San Francisco Giants in 28th round of the  First-Year Player draft, the 29th round of the  draft, and by the Florida Marlins in the 25th round of the  draft, but did not sign. In the  draft, he was once again selected by the Giants in the 15th round and made his professional debut with the Class A Salem-Keizer Volcanoes. He finished with a 3.68 ERA in 25 relief appearances, struck out 33 batters and walked 18 in 22 innings.

He struck out a season high nine batters in five shutout innings to earn a win on May 11, 2006. On May 15, 2008, Hinshaw made his major league debut after being called up when Merkin Valdéz went on the disabled list. Facing the Houston Astros, he gave up one hit and struck out one in 1/3 of an inning.

San Diego Padres

Hinshaw signed a minor league contract with the San Diego Padres on December 1, 2011.  He was designated for assignment on August 14, 2012, and claimed off waivers by the Chicago Cubs on August 19. On October 6, 2012 Hinshaw elected free agency. In 37 games with the Padres, Hinshaw had a 4.50 ERA while striking out 36 in 28 innings. In 2 games with the Cubs, Hinshaw had a 135.00 ERA, giving up 5 runs while recording 1 out.

Toronto Blue Jays

On November 21, 2012, the Toronto Blue Jays announced that Hinshaw had been signed to a minor league contract with an invitation to spring training. Hinshaw started the 2013 season with the Triple-A Buffalo Bisons but encountered troubles with walks (17 in 11 innings pitched), and was released on May 10.

Somerset Patriots

Hinshaw was signed by the Somerset Patriots of the Atlantic League of Professional Baseball on May 31, 2013, and released on June 13.

Bridgeport Bluefish

He was signed by the Bridgeport Bluefish, also of the Atlantic League, on June 22.

Wichita Wingnuts

Hinshaw signed with the Wichita Wingnuts for the 2014 season.

Scouting report
He throws his fastball in the mid 90s, and also has a slider and a big-breaking curveball.

Personal life
Enters home games to the song "All the Above" by hip-hop artist Maino.

Parents are Robert and Homa Hinshaw of Claremont, California.

Hinshaw is married to his San Diego State University sweetheart Courtney Fritz, a guard on the Aztecs Women's Basketball team.

Minor league honors
2006 CAL Mid-Season All-Star
2006 HWB Post-Season All-Star
2007 EAS Mid-Season.
2008 Arizona Fall League Rising-Star
First member of the Giant's 2005 draft class to reach the major leagues

References

External links

1982 births
Living people
American people of Afghan descent
San Francisco Giants players
San Diego Padres players
Chicago Cubs players
Baseball players from California
Chaffey Panthers baseball players
Major League Baseball pitchers
Salem-Keizer Volcanoes players
San Jose Giants players
Connecticut Defenders players
Richmond Flying Squirrels players
Fresno Grizzlies players
Tucson Padres players
Buffalo Bisons (minor league) players
Bridgeport Bluefish players
Sportspeople from Pomona, California
Sportspeople of Afghan descent
San Diego State Aztecs baseball players
Somerset Patriots players
Wichita Wingnuts players
Grand Prairie AirHogs players
Waikiki Beach Boys players
Scottsdale Scorpions players
Caribes de Anzoátegui players
Águilas de Mexicali players
American expatriate baseball players in Mexico
American expatriate baseball players in Venezuela